Archidendropsis thozetiana  is a species of tree native to the dry rainforests and gallery forests of Queensland, Australia.

References

http://www.anbg.gov.au/abrs/online-resources/flora/stddisplay.xsql?pnid=1685

 
Flora of Queensland
Bushfood
Taxa named by Ferdinand von Mueller